2020 World Cup may refer to:

Association football
2020 FIFA Futsal World Cup
2020 FIFA Club World Cup
2020 FIFA U-20 Women's World Cup
2020 FIFA U-17 Women's World Cup

Cricket
2020 ICC T20 World Cup
2020 Under-19 Cricket World Cup
2020 ICC Women's T20 World Cup
2020–22 ICC Cricket World Cup Super League

Winter sports
2019–20 FIS Alpine Ski World Cup

Other sports
2020 Canoe Slalom World Cup
2020 FIA World Cup for Cross-Country Bajas
2020 FIA World Cup for Cross-Country Rallies
2020 Individual Wrestling World Cup

See also
2020 in sports